Bykovo is a rural locality (a village) in Pogorelovskoye Rural Settlement, Totemsky  District, Vologda Oblast, Russia. The population was 52 as of 2002.

Geography 
Bykovo is located 60 km southwest of Totma (the district's administrative centre) by road. Zhilino is the nearest rural locality.

References 

Rural localities in Totemsky District